Aethes rectilineana is a species of moth of the family Tortricidae. It was described by Aristide Caradja in 1939. It is found in China (Gansu, Heilongjiang, Henan, Hubei, Jiangsu, Shandong, Shanxi, Xinjiang, Zhejiang), Japan, Korea, Mongolia and Russia.

References

rectilineana
Moths described in 1939
Moths of Asia
Moths of Japan
Moths of Korea